Stephen Roark Gyllenhaal (born October 4, 1949) is an American film director and poet. He is the father of actors Jake Gyllenhaal and Maggie Gyllenhaal.

Personal life
Gyllenhaal was born in Cleveland, Ohio, to Virginia Lowrie (née Childs) and Hugh Anders Gyllenhaal. He is of Swedish and English descent; through his father, he is a member of the Gyllenhaal family, and a descendant of the cavalry officer Nils Gunnesson Haal, who was ennobled in 1652 when Queen Christina of Sweden conferred upon him the crest and family name, "Gyllenhaal". Stephen grew up in Bryn Athyn, Pennsylvania, a suburb of Philadelphia in a close-knit Swedenborgian family and graduated from Trinity College in Hartford, Connecticut in 1972, with a degree in English. His mentor at Trinity was the poet Hugh Ogden.

He was married to screenwriter Naomi Foner Gyllenhaal for 32 years, from 1977 until their divorce was finalized in 2009. From that marriage, he is the father of actress Maggie Gyllenhaal and actor Jake Gyllenhaal. He is also the brother of Anders Gyllenhaal, executive editor of the Miami Herald.

In July 2011, he married Kathleen Man, a filmmaker and professor who was a co-producer on Gyllenhaal's 2012 film Grassroots. Their son Luke was born in 2014.

Career
Gyllenhaal directed the film version of the Pete Dexter novel Paris Trout, which was nominated for five Emmy Awards and won him a DGA Award. In 1990, Gyllenhaal directed Family of Spies, which was nominated for two Golden Globe Awards and an Emmy. In 1992, he directed the feature film Waterland, starring Jeremy Irons and Ethan Hawke. Since 1993, he has focused primarily on directing in television, including an episode of the ABC television series Twin Peaks. He directed his son, Jake, then 14 years old, in an episode of NBC's Homicide: Life on the Street that aired in 1994. Gyllenhaal directed several episodes of the CBS series Numb3rs, The Mentalist, Hawthorne, Army Wives, Rectify, and Blue Bloods. In 2011, Gyllenhaal directed Girl Fight which starred Anne Heche and earned Gyllenhaal a DGA Nomination for outstanding directorial achievement in movies for television.

He is also a poet, who has been published in literary journals such as Prairie Schooner and Nimrod. His first collection of poetry, Claptrap: Notes from Hollywood, was published in June 2006 by Cantara Christopher's New York–based literary small press, Cantarabooks.

In 2013, Gyllenhaal directed a backdoor pilot originally titled Sworn to Silence that aired as the Lifetime TV movie An Amish Murder. It stars Neve Campbell as a local police detective who must solve a murder case that involves the Amish Community she was shunned from years ago. Gyllenhaal is also in post-production on a documentary about dream interpretation titled Exquisite Continent.

In 2019, Gyllenhaal was on the "Social Impact Advisory Board" of the San Diego International Film Festival with Susan Sarandon and Cecelia Peck.

Selected filmography

References

External links

The Gyllenhaal name
 Genealogy of the Gyllenhaal family

1949 births
American film producers
American people of Swedish descent
American people of English descent
American male poets
American Swedenborgians
American television directors
Film directors from Ohio
Stephen
Living people
Writers from Cleveland
Trinity College (Connecticut) alumni
Poets from Ohio